Lisiate Fa'aoso (born Kolonga, 18 March 1983) is a Tongan rugby union footballer who currently plays for Bayonne.

Career
Fa'aoso plays for Bayonne. He has been in the Tonga squad since 2004. He was also selected for the 2007 Rugby World Cup finals where he played two matches.

References

External links
Player profile at Rugby World Cup (RWC) 2007 website

1983 births
Living people
Tongan rugby union players
Rugby union locks
Tonga international rugby union players
Tongan expatriate rugby union players
Expatriate rugby union players in Japan
Expatriate rugby union players in France
Tongan expatriate sportspeople in France
Tongan expatriate sportspeople in Japan
Black Rams Tokyo players
Manawatu rugby union players
SU Agen Lot-et-Garonne players
Aviron Bayonnais players
People from Tongatapu